Joshua Thomas March (born 18 March 1997) is an English professional footballer who plays as a striker for Stevenage.

Career
Born in Stourbridge, March began his career with Alvechurch, becoming the club's first contracted player in a decade in May 2017, and scoring 81 goals in 184 matches, being described as "an integral part in [the club's] rise from the Midland Alliance to the Southern Premier ". He then played for Leamington for the 2019–20 season, scoring 24 goals in 27 games, before signing for League Two side Forest Green Rovers in January 2020. He missed the start of the 2020–21 season due to a thigh injury.

On 5 January 2021, March joined League Two side Harrogate Town on loan until the end of the 2020–21 season. His loan ended on 11 March 2021 after he suffered an injury in a match.

He signed for Stevenage in January 2023.

Career statistics

Honours
Forest Green Rovers
League Two: 2021–22

References

1997 births
Living people
Sportspeople from Stourbridge
English footballers
Association football forwards
Midland Football League players
Northern Premier League players
Southern Football League players
National League (English football) players
English Football League players
Alvechurch F.C. players
Leamington F.C. players
Forest Green Rovers F.C. players
Harrogate Town A.F.C. players
Stevenage F.C. players